Elur Pudupatti is a settlement in the Namakkal district in Tamil Nadu. Elur Pudupatti's PIN code is 637018. The region's economy is mostly made up of finance, agriculture, and cloth weaving.

Points of interest 

 Union Primary School
 Lakkapuram Agricultutural Coopertive Society
 Post office

References 

Villages in Tiruchirappalli district